Tabart is a surname. Notable people with the surname include:

 Benjamin Tabart (1767–1833), publisher and bookseller
 Deborah Tabart, environmentalist
 Jill Tabart (born 1941), cleric
 John Tabart (1827–1894), cricketer
 Pierre Tabart (1645–1716), composer 
 Tom Tabart (1877–1950), cricketer